Pomaderris pallida, commonly known as pale pomaderris, is a species of flowering plant in the family Rhamnaceae and is endemic to the south-east of continental Australia. It is a compact, rounded shrub with hairy stems, narrowly elliptic to narrowly oblong leaves and panicles of cream-coloured flowers.

Description
Flowering occurs from September to December and the fruit is a hairy capsule.

Taxonomy
Pomaderris pallida was first formally described in 1951 by Norman Arthur Wakefield in The Victorian Naturalist from specimens collected by Richard Hind Cambage near the junction of the Murrumbidgee and Cotter Rivers in 1911. The specific epithet (pallida) means "pale".

Distribution and habitat
This pomaderris grows in open forest and scrub in woodland but is only known from a few populations in the Australian Capital Territory and south-eastern New South Wales.

Conservation status
Pomaderris pallida is list as "vulnerable" under the Australian Government Environment Protection and Biodiversity Conservation Act 1999 and the New South Wales Government Biodiversity Conservation Act 2016.

References

Flora of New South Wales
Flora of the Australian Capital Territory
pallida
Plants described in 1951
Taxa named by Norman Arthur Wakefield